Darkan may refer to:
 Darkan, Western Australia
 Darkan, Iran (disambiguation)
 Darkan, Kyrgyzstan, a village in Issyk-Kul Region